Vitálico Cándido Coheto Martínez (born 4 September 1941) is a Mexican politician. He is a member of the Chamber of Deputies, representing Oaxaca, and currently presides over the Chamber's Commission on Indigenous Affairs. He belongs to the Institutional Revolutionary Party.

References

Living people
1941 births
Politicians from Oaxaca
Members of the Chamber of Deputies (Mexico)
Institutional Revolutionary Party politicians
20th-century Mexican politicians
21st-century Mexican politicians